Gerry or Jerry Browne may refer to:

Jerry Browne (born 1966), American baseball player
Gerry Browne (born 1944), Trinidadian and Tobagonian footballer
Gerry Browne (Gaelic footballer), see Mick Aherne

See also
Gerald Browne (disambiguation)
Gerry Brown (disambiguation)
Jerry Brown (disambiguation)